The Kiss is a 1921 American silent drama film directed by Jack Conway and starring Carmel Myers, George Periolat and J.P. Lockney

Cast
 George Periolat as Don Luis Baldarama 
 W.E. Lawrence as Andre Baldarama 
 J.P. Lockney as Selistino Vargas 
 Carmel Myers as Erolinda Vargas 
 J. Jiquel Lanoe as Carlos 
 Harvey Clark as Miguel Chavez 
 Jean Acker as Isabella Chavez 
 Ed Brady as Manuel Feliz

References

Bibliography
 James Robert Parish & Michael R. Pitts. Film directors: a guide to their American films. Scarecrow Press, 1974.

External links
 

1921 films
1921 drama films
1920s English-language films
American silent feature films
Silent American drama films
Films directed by Jack Conway
American black-and-white films
Universal Pictures films
Films based on works by Johnston McCulley
1920s American films